Island council elections were held in the Netherlands Antilles on 10 April (Bonaire and Curaçao) and 22 May 1987 (SSS islands) to elect the members of the island councils of its five island territories. The election was won by the Bonaire Patriotic Union–Bonaire Workers' Party list (5 seats) in Bonaire, the National People's Party (8 seats) in Curaçao, the Saba Democratic Labour Movement (3 seats) in Saba, the Democratic Party Statia (3 seats) in Sint Eustatius, and the Democratic Party (7 seats) in Sint Maarten.

Results

Bonaire

Curaçao

Saba

Sint Eustatius

Sint Maarten

References

1987 elections in the Caribbean
1987 in the Netherlands Antilles
April 1987 events in North America
May 1987 events in North America
Elections in the Netherlands Antilles
Elections in Bonaire
Elections in Curaçao
Elections in Saba (island)
Elections in Sint Eustatius
Elections in Sint Maarten